The following is a list of members of the American Academy of Arts and Sciences from the years 1953 to 1993.

1953 

 Barbara Wharton Low

1956 

 Gerald Holton
 Robert M. Solow

1957 

 Walter Heinrich Munk
 James Dewey Watson

1958 

 Louis Wellington Cabot
 John Torrence Tate, Jr.
 Robert Walter Williams

1959 

 Henry Alfred Kissinger
 Tsung-Dao Lee
 Isadore Manuel Singer
 Edward O. Wilson
 Chen Ning Yang

1960 

 Arthur Earl Bryson, Jr.
 Elias James Corey
 Jean-Pierre Serre

1961 

 John Willard Milnor
 Ronald Filmore Probstein

1962 

 Donald Sommers Blough
 George Whipple Clark
 Stephen Richards Graubard
 Matthew Stanley Meselson
 Guido Munch
 Leontyne Price
 John Wermer

1963 

 Bernard Bailyn
 Avram Noam Chomsky
 David Raymond Layzer
 Arthur Edward Lilley
 Arthur Beck Pardee
 David Rutstein
 George Veronis

1964 

 Benjamin Peter Dailey
 Manfred Eigen
 Dudley Robert Herschbach
 Howard H. Hiatt
 Henry Pratt McKean
 David Bryant Mumford
 Paul Snowden Russell

1965 

 Frederick Henry Abernathy
 Frederick Davis Greene II
 Richard Charles Lewontin
 Herbert George Weiss

1966 

 Lewis McAdory Branscomb
 Sydney Brenner
 Geoffrey Foucar Chew
 Albert Jakob Eschenmoser
 Martin Karplus
 Joseph John Kohn
 Peter David Lax
 William Liller
 Edward Wilson Merrill

1967 

 Lennart Axel Edvard Carleson
 Anthony Gervin Oettinger
 Ieoh Ming Pei
 Stuart Alan Rice
 Harold Abraham Scheraga
 Jack Leonard Strominger
 Torsten Nils Wiesel

1968 

 Richard Earl Caves
 Joseph Grafton Gall
 Alan Garen
 Walter Gilbert
 Harvey Philip Greenspan
 Jerome Kagan
 Martin Emil Marty
 Phil Caldwell Neal
 Stephen Smale
 Steven Weinberg
 Kenneth Berle Wiberg

1969 

 Michael Artin
 Eric Bentley
 Derek Curtis Bok
 Jerome Alan Cohen
 Alfred Walter Crompton
 Richard Lawrence Garwin
 Heisuke Hironaka
 Dale Weldeau Jorgenson
 Henry Rosovsky
 Maarten Schmidt
 Irwin Ira Shapiro
 Jack Steinberger
 Shlomo Zvi Sternberg
 Noboru Sueoka
 Paul Talalay

1970 

 Bruce Nathan Ames
 Sigurður Helgason
 Donald Lawrence Keene
 Robert Jay Lifton
 Everett Irwin Mendelsohn
 Joseph Hillis Miller
 Eugene Newman Parker
 Roy Radner
 George Pratt Shultz

1971 

 Donald David Brown
 Ramsey Clark
 Martin Robert Coles
 Renée Claire Fox
 Antony Hewish
 Roald Hoffmann
 Richard Hadley Holm
 Kenneth Keniston
 Ben Roy Mottelson
 Marc Leon Nerlove
 William Frank Pounds
 Michael Sela
 Eugene B. Skolnikoff
 Herbert Tabor
 Michael Laban Walzer
 Bruce Wallace

1972 

 John Dickson Baldeschwieler
 Walter Fred Bodmer
 Marcel Paul Boiteux
 William Hines Bossert
 Guido Calabresi
 Donald L. D. Caspar
 John Elliott Dowling
 Charles Louis Fefferman
 George Brooks Field
 Edmond Henri Fischer
 Valerie Jane Goodall
 Arnold Carl Harberger
 János Kornai
 Leo Marx
 Michael Brendan McElroy
 Dana Stewart Scott
 Kip Stephen Thorne
 Pindaros Roy Vagelos
 Helen Hennessy Vendler

1973 

 Karl Frank Austen
 Eugene Braunwald
 James Edwin Darnell, Jr.
 Jared Mason Diamond
 Peter Martin Goldreich
 Ralph Edward Gomory
 Leo A. Goodman
 Hanna Holborn Gray
 James Moody Gustafson
 Daniel J. Kleitman
 Donald Ervin Knuth
 Israel Robert Lehman
 Rudolph Arthur Marcus
 Calvin Cooper Moore
 Gordon Hemenway Pettengill
 Guy Rocher
 Richard Leon Sidman
 Nur Osman Yalman

1974 

 Stephen Louis Adler
 Clarence Roderic Allen
 Richard Chatham Atkinson
 Robert John Aumann
 W. Gerald Austen
 David Baltimore
 John Simmons Barth
 James Daniel Bjorken
 Daniel Branton
 Victor Henri Brombert
 Edgar H. Brown, Jr.
 Herman Chernoff
 Leon N. Cooper
 Richard Newell Cooper
 David Roxbee Cox
 Frank Donald Drake
 Leo Esaki
 Robert W. Floyd
 Richard Newton Gardner
 Ivar Giaever
 Sheldon Glashow
 Timothy Henshaw Goldsmith
 Gordon G. Hammes
 Harold John Hanham
 Berthold Karl Holldobler
 Frank Matthew Huennekens
 Brian David Josephson
 David Kipnis
 Emmanuel Bernard Le Roy Ladurie
 Gustav Joseph Victor Nossal
 Harry Rubin
 Malvin Avram Ruderman
 Martin Mathew Shapiro
 Eleanor Bernert Sheldon
 Otto Thomas Solbrig
 Alar Toomre
 Ezra F. Vogel

1975 

 Winslow Russell Briggs
 James Paddock Collman
 Ernest Peter Geiduschek
 Marion Frederick Hawthorne
 John Joseph Hopfield
 Yuan Tseh Lee
 Jeremiah Paul Ostriker
 Elena V. Paducheva
 Sheldon Penman
 Alvin Carl Plantinga
 John Pocock
 Michael Oser Rabin
 Calyampudi Radakrishna Rao
 Martin John Rees
 Edward Reich
 Charles Clifton Richardson
 Carlo Rubbia
 Lubert Stryer
 Samuel C.C. Ting
 Harrison Colyar White
 George McClelland Whitesides

1976 

 Julius Adler
 Rodney Armstrong
 Frederick George Bailey
 Brian Joe Lobley Berry
 John I. Brauman
 Frederick Phillips Brooks, Jr.
 Thomas Charles Bruice
 Bruno Coppi
 Owen Gingerich
 Roy Gerald Gordon
 David S. Hogness
 John Woodside Hutchinson
 Eric Richard Kandel
 Kenneth Irwin Kellermann
 Edward Arthur Kravitz
 William Labov
 Reimar Lust
 Chandra Kumar Naranbhai Patel
 John Charles Polanyi
 Marshall David Sahlins
 Speros Vryonis, Jr.
 William Barry Wood
 Richard Neil Zare

1977 

 Anthony Guy Amsterdam
 Francisco Jose Ayala
 Glen Warren Bowersock
 Anthony Downs
 John Huxtable Elliott
 Lawrence M. Friedman
 Avram Jacob Goldberg
 Irving H. Goldberg
 Jeffrey Goldstone
 Lee Grodzins
 Francois Gros
 James Edward Gunn
 Eric Donald Hirsch, Jr.
 William Edward Leuchtenburg
 Richard Siegmund Lindzen
 William James McCune Jr.
 Daniel Little McFadden
 John Williams Mellor
 Elizabeth Fondal Neufeld
 P. James E. Peebles
 Mark Steven Ptashne
 Peter Hamilton Raven
 John Rogers Searle
 Nathan Sivin
 Andrew Streitwieser, Jr.
 Peter Albert Strittmatter
 Paul Edward Waggoner
 Tai Tsun Wu

1978 

 Bruce Michael Alberts
 Suzanne Berger
 R. Stephen Berry
 Floyd Elliott Bloom
 Walter Dean Burnham
 Stanley Norman Cohen
 Pierre Deligne
 Hector Floyd DeLuca
 John Mark Deutch
 Peter Arthur Diamond
 Theodor Otto Diener
 Jacques H. Dreze
 Richard A. Easterlin
 Thomas V. Gamkrelidze
 Theodore Henry Geballe
 Johannes Geiss
 John Bertrand Gurdon
 Robert Louis Herbert
 Roman Wladimir Jackiw
 Arthur Michael Jaffe
 Donald R. Kelley
 George Alexander Kennedy
 Gerald Holmes Kramer
 Saul Aaron Kripke
 Barry Charles Mazur
 James Robert Rice
 Andrew Victor Schally
 Maxine Frank Singer
 Charles Francis Westoff
 Robert Woodrow Wilson
 Evelyn Maisel Witkin

1979 

 Enrico Bombieri
 Herbert Wayne Boyer
 Peter Robert Lamont Brown
 John Somerset Chipman
 John Rouben David
 Paul A. David
 Natalie Zemon Davis
 Stanley Deser
 Michael Ellis Fisher
 Hans Emil Frauenfelder
 Harry Barkus Gray
 Guido Guidotti
 Melvin Lester Kohn
 Masakazu Konishi
 Gene Elden Likens
 Arno J. Mayer
 Kenneth Prewitt
 Leon Theodore Silver
 Solomon Halbert Snyder
 Lynn Ray Sykes
 Peter Hans von Hippel
 Carl Christian von Weizsäcker
 Benjamin Widom
 Carl Isaac Wunsch

1980 

 Albert Bandura
 Emilio Bizzi
 Gerhard Casper
 Robert Choate Darnton
 Merton Corson Flemings
 Jerome Isaac Friedman
 Edwin Jean Furshpan
 Kent Greenawalt
 Edward Crosby Johnson
 Ivan Robert King
 Joseph LaPalombara
 Jean-Marie Pierre Lehn
 Robert Emerson Lucas, Jr.
 Joseph Boyd Martin
 William Frederick Miller
 Claes Thure Oldenburg
 Ronald Howard Paulson
 Edmund Strother Phelps
 David Pines
 Hanna Fenichel Pitkin
 Robert David Putnam
 David Domingo Sabatini
 Roger Newland Shepard
 David Arthur Shirley
 Hamilton Othanel Smith
 Laurence Henry Tribe
 Mack Walker
 George Masters Woodwell
 Israel Zelitch

1981 

 Robert Lesh Baldwin
 Hyman Bass
 Gordon Alan Baym
 Overton Brent Berlin
 Robert Bird
 Michael Stuart Brown
 Michael Cole
 Kenneth W. Dam
 Wallace Gary Ernst
 Donald Lee Fanger
 Gary Felsenfeld
 Stanley Fischer
 James Gilbert Glimm
 Joseph Leonard Goldstein
 Loren Raymond Graham
 Bertrand Israel Halperin
 Leslie Lars Iversen
 Nelson Yuan-Sheng Kiang
 Thomas Nagel
 Robert Owen Paxton
 Nicholas P. Samios
 Amartya Kumar Sen
 Hugh Pettingill Taylor Jr.
 Seiya Uyeda
 Robert Butler Wilson

1982 

 Jagdish N. Bhagwati
 Paul Brest
 Stephen G. Breyer
 Herbert Horace Clark
 William Henry Danforth
 Peter Demetz
 Paul Ralph Ehrlich
 Victor Robert Fuchs
 Herbert J. Gans
 Howard Georgi
 Ruth Bader Ginsburg
 Kurt Gottfried
 Roy Walter Gould
 Paul R. Gross
 Leroy Edward Hood
 Akira Iriye
 M. Kent Jennings
 Clifford Charles Lamberg-Karlovsky
 Beatrice Mintz
 Harold Alfred Mooney
 Douglas Dean Osheroff
 Charles Dacre Parsons
 Richard A. Posner
 John Thomas Potts, Jr.
 Jesse Roth
 Bengt Ingemar Samuelsson
 Franklin William Stahl
 Joan Argetsinger Steitz
 Joseph Hooton Taylor Jr.
 David William Tracy
 Barry Martin Trost
 James Wei
 Jean Donald Wilson
 Christoph Wolff
 Amnon Zalman Yariv
 Theodore Joseph Ziolkowski

1983 

 Richard Axel
 Robert Weierter Balluffi
 Olle Erik Bjorkman
 Jesse Herbert Choper
 Denis Donoghue
 Bradley Efron
 Martin Frank Gellert
 Gerhard Hans Giebisch
 Victor William Guillemin
 Theodor Wolfgang Hansch
 Prudence Oliver Harper
 Henry Hugh Heclo
 John Paul Holdren
 Erich Peter Ippen
 Ronald Winthrop Jones
 David B. Kaplan
 Robert Owen Keohane
 Anne Osborn Krueger
 James Stephen Langer
 Stanley Lieberson
 David G. Nathan
 Fernando Nottebohm
 Douglas Whiting Rae
 Arthur Harold Rubenstein
 Thomas John Sargent
 Phillip Allen Sharp
 Yakov G. Sinai
 Gabor Arpad Somorjai
 Andrew Michael Spence
 Harold Mead Stark
 Joseph Eugene Stiglitz
 Keith Vivian Thomas
 Ray John Weymann
 Shmuel Winograd
 Shing-Tung Yau

1984 

 Werner Arber
 George Bernard Benedek
 Stephen James Benkovic
 Robert George Bergman
 John Michael Bishop
 William Browder
 Burrell Clark Burchfiel
 George Cardona
 Fernando Henrique Cardoso
 Samuel J. Danishefsky
 Melvin Aron Eisenberg
 Raymond Leo Erikson
 Gerald R. Fink
 Morris Paul Fiorina
 Dagfinn Kaare Follesdal
 Ian Michael Glynn
 Edward Grant
 Jürgen Habermas
 Robert M. Hauser
 Joseph Frederick Hoffman
 Nick Holonyak, Jr.
 Jasper Johns
 Nicole Marthe Le Douarin
 Jack Lewis
 Lewis Henry Lockwood
 David Raymond Mayhew
 Hugh O'Neill McDevitt
 Robert Lawrence Middlekauff
 Sally Falk Moore
 William D. Nordhaus
 Joseph Samuel Nye
 Tomoko Ohta
 Barbara Hall Partee
 Paul Linford Richards
 Matthew Daniel Scharff
 Karl Barry Sharpless
 Eytan Sheshinski
 Hugo Freund Sonnenschein
 Charles F. Stevens
 Monkombu S. Swaminathan
 Susumu Tonegawa
 James William Valentine
 James Chuo Wang
 Edward Witten
 Peter Shaw Ashton

1985 

 John Norman Abelson
 George A. Akerlof
 Takeshi Amemiya
 James Gilbert Anderson
 Robert Axelrod
 Jonathan Francis Bennett
 Howard Curtis Berg
 David Botstein
 Alfred Brendel
 Pierre Chambon
 Yvonne Choquet-Bruhat
 Richard Earl Dickerson
 Russell F. Doolittle
 Stanley L. Engerman
 Richard A. Epstein
 John Arthur Ferejohn
 Stanley Eugene Fish
 Michael H. Freedman
 Michael Fried
 Antonio Garcia-Bellido
 David Marvin Green
 David Jonathan Gross
 Robert Ernest Hall
 James Joseph Heckman
 Fredric R. Jameson
 Richard M. Karp
 Yoshito Kishi
 Alasdair MacIntyre
 Thomas Peter Maniatis
 Hubert S. Markl
 Andreu Mas-Colell
 Fred Warren McLafferty
 Mary Lou Pardue
 David Roger Pilbeam
 Charles Raymond Plott
 Diane Silvers Ravitch
 Roland W. Schmitt
 Jonathan Dermot Spence
 William Gilbert Strang
 Robert Endre Tarjan
 Karen Keskulla Uhlenbeck
 Alice Tallulah Kate Walker
 Christopher Thomas Walsh
 Daniel I-Chyau Wang
 Charles Weissmann
 Harriet Anne Zuckerman

1986 

 Gerard 't Hooft
 Bruce Arnold Ackerman
 Perry Lee Adkisson
 Robert Alter
 Jonathan Roger Beckwith
 Peter John Bickel
 Ralph Lawrence Brinster
 Peter Stephen Paul Brook
 Robert Sanford Brustein
 Luis Angel Caffarelli
 John Anthony Carbon
 Stephen A. Cook
 Paul Josef Crutzen
 Derek A. Denton
 Mostafa Amr El-Sayed
 Alain Enthoven
 Ray Franklin Evert
 Daniel Z. Freedman
 David Pierpont Gardner
 Carlo Ginzburg
 Ronald Lewis Graham
 Erich S. Gruen
 Masayori Inouye
 Robert Jervis
 Howard Ronald Kaback
 Daniel Kleppner
 Albert Joseph Libchaber
 Hans Arthur Linde
 Stephen James Lippard
 Richard Burt Melrose
 Robert C. Merton
 Frank Isaac Michelman
 Cynthia Ozick
 Peter Mark Paret
 Michael I. Posner
 Samuel Preston
 Chintamani Nagesa Ramachandra Rao
 Charles Ernest Rosenberg
 Walter Garrison Runciman
 Charles Vernon Shank
 Quentin Robert Duthie Skinner
 Tom Stoppard
 Charles Margrave Taylor
 Peter Temin
 Endel Tulving

1987 

 Claude Jean Allègre
 Aharon Barak
 Robert J. Birgeneau
 David Edgeworth Butler
 Curtis G. Callan
 Georges N. Cohen
 Earl W. Davie
 Carl-Wilhelm Reinhold de Boor
 Daniel Dennett
 Patricia K. Donahoe
 Marcus William Feldman
 Avner Friedman
 Brian Albert Gerrish
 Robert Gilpin
 Stephen Greenblatt
 Alan H. Guth
 Robert Haselkorn
 Donald Helinski
 Alan Jerome Hoffman
 John Edward Hopcroft
 Peter J. Huber
 Jiri Jonas
 Hiroo Kanamori
 Peter Katzenstein
 Herbert Kaufman
 Andrew Herbert Knoll
 Walter LaFeber
 John H. Langbein
 Susan Epstein Leeman
 Donald Harris Levy
 Leon Litwack
 Bernard Lown
 Harry M. Markowitz
 Albert R. Meyer
 Nicholas Avrion Mitchison
 Joel Moses
 Gregory Nagy
 Takeshi Oka
 Paul H. Rabinowitz
 William J. Rutter
 Terrance Sandalow
 Paul Reinhard Schimmel
 Benno Charles Schmidt, Jr.
 Roy Frederick Schwitters
 Melvin I. Simon
 Wole Soyinka
 Richard B. Stewart
 Stephen M. Stigler
 William Clark Still
 Lawrence H. Summers
 John Whittle Terborgh
 Roberto Mangabeira Unger
 Alexander Varshavsky
 Larzer Ziff

1988 

 Sidney Altman
 David Arnett
 Margaret Atwood
 Robert Joseph Barro
 Max Marcell Burger
 Friedrich Hermann Busse
 Charles R. Cantor
 Thomas Robert Cech
 James Franklin Childress
 Purnell W. Choppin
 John MacLeod Chowning
 Pedro M. Cuatrecasas
 Peter Brendan Dervan
 Glen Holl Elder, Jr.
 Jon Elster
 David Albert Evans
 Alan Roy Fersht
 Gerald David Fischbach
 Patricia Albjerg Graham
 Sanford Jay Grossman
 Willy Haeberli
 Oliver Simon D'Arcy Hart
 Daniel L. Heartz
 John L. Heilbron
 Julian Hochberg
 Richard Joseph Howard
 Susan Werner Kieffer
 Stuart Arthur Kornfeld
 Heather Nan Lechtman
 Robert Joseph Lefkowitz
 N. David Mermin
 Henry P. Monaghan
 David Robert Nelson
 Martha Craven Nussbaum
 Richard Deforest Palmiter
 John Winsor Pratt
 John Michael Prausnitz
 Simon Michael Schama
 Richard Melvin Schoen
 Christopher A. Sims
 Edwin M. Southern
 Richard Peter Stanley
 Steven Mitchell Stanley
 Peter David Lyman Stansky
 Wayne Thiebaud
 Samuel Osiah Thier
 Tu Weiming
 Srinivasa Rangaiyengar Varadhan
 Harold Eliot Varmus
 Wlodzimierz Józef Wesolowski
 Marina von Neumann Whitman
 Sheila Evans Widnall
 William Julius Wilson
 Gordon Stewart Wood
 Mark Stephen Wrighton
 Menahem Yaari

1989 

 Barbara Aronstein Black
 David W. Brady
 Alfred Yi Cho
 Ching-Wu Paul Chu
 John Adam Clausen
 Joel Ephraim Cohen
 Alain Connes
 Joan Ganz Cooney
 Igor Bert Dawid
 Persi Diaconis
 Joan Didion
 Wendy Doniger
 Margaret Drabble
 Harry T. Edwards
 Sandra Moore Faber
 Eugene F. Fama
 Nina V. Fedoroff
 John E. Ffowcs-Williams
 Eric Foner
 Mary Katharine Ralph Gaillard
 James F. Gibbons
 Vartan Gregorian
 Mikhael Gromov
 Stephen Coplan Harrison
 James Burkett Hartle
 Wu-chung Hsiang
 Charles Oscar Jones
 Thomas J. Kelly, Jr.
 Paul Michael Kennedy
 Marc Wallace Kirschner
 Edward E. Leamer
 Robert Alan LeVine
 Arend Lijphart
 Assar Lindbeck
 Anthony Arthur Long
 Elizabeth McCormack
 Newton N. Minow
 Mortimer Mishkin
 Roy Parviz Mottahedeh
 William James Perry
 George Putnam
 Michael Llewellyn Rutter
 Sandra Wood Scarr
 Richard Royce Schrock
 Howard Stein
 Patrick Thaddeus
 Judith Jarvis Thomson
 Jürgen Troe
 Emil Raphael Unanue
 Thomas Alexander Waldmann
 Robert Allan Weinberg
 Keith Robert Yamamoto

1990 

 James Roger Prior Angel
 Allen Joseph Bard
 Stephen Davison Bechtel, Jr.
 Olivier Blanchard
 Barry R. Bloom
 Robert Hamilton Cannon, Jr.
 Michael John Chamberlin
 Paul M. Cook
 Malcolm Roderick Currie
 Peter Florian Dembowski
 Mark di Suvero
 James Louis Dye
 Friedrich Ehrendorfer
 Thomas Eugene Everhart
 John Hurley Flavell
 Marion R. Fremont-Smith
 Robert Alan Frosch
 Margaret Joan Geller
 Allan F. Gibbard
 Gerald Verne Gibbs
 Roger Anthony Gorski
 Richard Herr
 Karen Elliott House
 Daniel Hunt Janzen
 Vernon Eulion Jordan Jr.
 Marvin Kalb
 Helene L. Kaplan
 Daniel Jerome Kevles
 Robert Phelan Langlands
 Gerald David Laubach
 Robert B. Laughlin
 David Morris Lee
 J. David Litster
 Susan Lowey
 Jane Menken
 Gordon Earle Moore
 John Mueller
 Masatoshi Nei
 Thomas Dean Pollard
 Judith Seitz Rodin
 Pierre Rosenberg
 Roald Zinnurovich Sagdeev
 Nayantara Sahgal
 J. William Schopf
 Peter G. Schultz
 Harold Tafler Shapiro
 Yuen-Ron Shen
 Kenneth A. Shepsle
 Raymond Stuart Stata
 John Meurig Thomas
 Shirley M. Tilghman
 Arnold Robert Weber
 Jack Bertrand Weinstein
 Irving Lerner Weissman
 Finis R. Welch
 Shirley Williams
 Robert Henry Wurtz
 John Alan Young
 Franklin Ester Zimring

1991 

 Robert Merrihew Adams
 Svetlana Alpers
 John Allan Armstrong
 David Attenborough
 Keith Michael Baker
 Jacqueline K. Barton
 Robert Hinrichs Bates
 Malcolm Roy Beasley
 John E. Bercaw
 Elizabeth Blackburn
 Alan Stuart Blinder
 John A. Brinkman
 Sarah Waterlow Broadie
 Peter Brooks
 Steve S. Chen
 Alexandre Joel Chorin
 Robert Charles Clark
 John M. Coetzee
 Frederick Campbell Crews
 Edwin Munson Curley
 Partha Sarathi Dasgupta
 John W. Dower
 John M. Dunn
 Peter Duus
 Igor Dzyaloshinskii
 Marian Wright Edelman
 David Samuel Eisenberg
 Marilyn G. Farquhar
 Anthony Stephen Fauci
 David L. Featherman
 Edward A. Feigenbaum
 James W. Fernandez
 Graham Richard Fleming
 Bertram O. Fraser-Reid
 Frank Owen Gehry
 Carol Gluck
 Ann M. Graybiel
 Christine Guthrie
 Ian Hacking
 Eugene Alfred Hammel
 Clayton Howell Heathcock
 Richard H. Helmholz
 Roger H. Hildebrand
 Christopher Hogg
 Lynn Hunt
 James A. Ibers
 Shirley Ann Jackson
 Gary C. Jacobson
 Joshua Jortner
 Paul L. Joskow
 C. Ronald Kahn
 Stanley N. Katz
 Nannerl O. Keohane
 John Wells Kingdon
 Nancy Elizabeth Kleckner
 Richard G. Klein
 Steven Elliot Koonin
 Stephen D. Krasner
 Patrick A. Lee
 David Charles Lindberg
 George Lusztig
 Peter S. Lynch
 Robert B. W. MacNeil
 Charles Steven Maier
 Philippa Marrack
 Gail Roberta Martin
 Jerry L. Mashaw
 Walter E. Massey
 Carver Andress Mead
 Elliot M. Meyerowitz
 Bill D. Moyers
 Laura Nader
 Donald A. Norman
 Gordon Howell Orians
 Donald Samuel Ornstein
 Stephen Owen
 Norman Richard Pace Jr.
 Orlando Patterson
 Walter Keith Percival
 Alexander M. Polyakov
 George Bingham Powell, Jr.
 Adam Przeworski
 Franklin Delano Raines
 Uttam L. RajBhandary
 Jane S. Richardson
 Christopher Bruce Ricks
 David Rockefeller, Jr.
 Felix Rohatyn
 Bernard Roizman
 Michael Geoffrey Rosenfeld
 Neil L. Rudenstine
 Joan V. Ruderman
 Peter Clive Sarnak
 Thomas William Schoener
 William R. Schowalter
 David O'Keefe Sears
 John H. Seinfeld
 Saharon Shelah
 Michael Silverstein
 Merritt Roe Smith
 Vernon Lomax Smith
 Allan Charles Spradling
 Edward Manin Stolper
 Daniel Wyler Stroock
 Joanne Stubbe
 Dennis Parnell Sullivan
 Harry L. Swinney
 Edwin William Taylor
 Arnold Wilfrid Thackray
 Franklin Augustine Thomas
 Kenneth Lane Thompson
 Maury Tigner
 Robert Warren Tucker
 Jean-Didier Vincent
 Frederick Wiseman
 Peter Guy Wolynes
 Richard Jay Zeckhauser

1992 

 Hans C. Andersen
 Julia Elizabeth Annas
 Janis Antonovics
 Elliot Aronson
 Michael George Aschbacher
 Norman R. Augustine
 David H. Auston
 J. P. Barger
 Denis Aristide Baylor
 Hans Belting
 Leo Bersani
 Frank Bidart
 John Herron Biggs
 Thomas Noel Bisson
 Lee C. Bollinger
 Henry Reid Bourne
 Harvey Kent Bowen
 William Frank Brinkman
 William Allen Brock III
 Richard Alan Brody
 Donald Jerome Brown
 Amyand David Buckingham
 Bruce J. Bueno de Mesquita
 Warren Edward Buffett
 Myles Fredric Burnyeat
 Ashton Carter
 Sylvia Teresse Aida Ceyer
 Sallie Watson Chisholm
 Steven Chu
 Aaron Victor Cicourel
 Timothy James Clark
 Michael Tran Clegg
 Marshall H. Cohen
 Claude Nessim Cohen-Tannoudji
 Jonathan Richard Cole
 Walter Robert Connor
 Max Dale Cooper
 Lynn A. Cooper
 Lawrence Frederick Dahl
 Gary Brent Dalrymple
 Marc Davis
 Angus Stewart Deaton
 Haile Tesfaye Debas
 Francis Joseph DiSalvo, Jr.
 David Donoho
 David Roach Dowty
 Frank Hoover Easterbrook
 Phoebe C. Ellsworth
 Reynolds Farley
 Joseph Felsenstein
 David Finn
 Leon Fleisher
 Daniel Willett Foster
 Peter L. Galison
 William Gates
 Claudia Goldin
 Jerry Paul Gollub
 Jean-Michel Grandmont
 Benedict Hyman Gross
 Carol A. Gross
 Frederick Duncan Michael Haldane
 Michael Thomas Hannan
 Conrad Kenneth Harper
 Juris Hartmanis
 Wayne A. Hendrickson
 W. Daniel Hillis
 Melvin Hochster
 Stephen Taylor Holmes
 Sarah Blaffer Hrdy
 Tony Hunter
 Rudolf Jaenisch
 Raymond Jeanloz
 Christopher Jencks
 Thomas M. Jessell
 Peter R. Kann
 John Albert Katzenellenbogen
 Amalya Lyle Kearse
 Edmund Keeley
 Maxine Hong Kingston
 Patrick Vinton Kirch
 Robert P. Kirshner
 Arthur Michael Kleinman
 David Marc Kreps
 Paul R. Krugman
 Sidney Leibovich
 Estella Bergere Leopold
 Wolf Lepenies
 Simon Asher Levin
 Barbara Huberman Liskov
 Robert Wendell Lucky
 Robert Duncan MacPherson
 David Baruch Malament
 Cyril Alexander Mango
 Grigoriy Margulis
 Pamela A. Matson
 John Henry McDowell
 James Lafayette McGaugh
 Donald F. McHenry
 Steven Lanier McKnight
 Ernesto Antonio Medina
 James Donald Meindl
 Paul Robert Milgrom
 Martha Louise Minow
 Kiyoshi Mizuuchi
 Navarre Scott Momaday
 Shigefumi Mori
 Royce Wilton Murray
 Erwin Neher
 Maria Iandolo New
 Richard E. Nisbett
 Philippe Pierre Nozieres
 Christiane Nusslein-Volhard
 Peter Carl Ordeshook
 Sherry Beth Ortner
 Seiji Ozawa
 Elaine Pagels
 Ira Harry Pastan
 Donald Wells Pfaff
 Edward C. Prescott
 Shulamit Ran
 Joseph Raz
 Seymour Reichlin
 Anna Curtenius Roosevelt
 Howard Lewis Rosenthal
 Gerald Mayer Rubin
 David P. Ruelle
 Bert Sakmann
 Sebastiao Ribeiro Salgado
 Douglas James Scalapino
 Elaine Scarry
 Jose A. Scheinkman
 Albrecht Schone
 James C. Scott
 Donna Edna Shalala
 Lucille Shapiro
 Carla Jo Shatz
 James John Sheehan
 Frank H. Shu
 Adele Smith Simmons
 Alvaro Siza
 Leonard Edward Slatkin
 Robert Eugene Somerville
 George Sperling
 Robert Stalnaker
 Rosemary A. Stevens
 Ursula Beate Storb
 Nobuo Suga
 Cass R. Sunstein
 Rashid Alievich Sunyaev
 Sidney G. Tarrow
 Susan S. Taylor
 Jacques Leon Tits
 Scott D. Tremaine
 Richard Francis Tuck
 Bert Vogelstein
 Alan David Weinstein
 Paul Anthony Wender
 James Boyd White
 John Edgar Wideman
 David Wiggins
 Jack Wisdom
 John Armstead Wood
 Arnold Melchior Zwicky

1993 

 Henry Jacob Aaron
 Andreas Acrivos
 Walter Alvarez
 Thomas W. Appelquist
 Michael Ashburner
 Michael Farries Ashby
 Orley Clark Ashenfelter
 Roger David Blandford
 R. Howard Bloch
 Martin Blume
 Sheila Ellen Blumstein
 Joan Toland Bok
 Leon Botstein
 David Ross Brillinger
 Alison Spence Brooks
 Charles Tyler Burge
 Ronald Stuart Burt
 Caroline Walker Bynum
 Sharon Cameron
 Robert Campbell
 James Earl Carter, Jr.
 Charles Philip Casey
 Mary-Dell Matchett Chilton
 Marvin Lou Cohen
 R. John Collier
 Elizabeth Cropper
 James E. Dahlberg
 Lorraine Jenifer Daston
 Ingrid Chantal Daubechies
 John Putnam Demos
 Charles Dempsey
 
 Alan Michael Dressler
 James Johnson Duderstadt
 Thomas Dunne
 Felton James Earls
 John S. Earman
 Gerhard Ludwig Ertl
 George Myles Cordell Fisher
 Kenneth Frampton
 Norman C. Francis
 Lambert Ben Freund
 Bruce Woodward Frier
 James Castle Gaither
 Marc S. Galanter
 Henry Louis Gates, Jr.
 Louise Elisabeth Gluck
 Lawrence Marshall Gold
 Peter Carl Goldmark, Jr.
 Corey Scott Goodman
 Norma Van Surdam Graham
 John Taylor Groves
 Charles Vernon Hamilton
 Lars Peter Hansen
 Neil Harris
 Elhanan Helpman
 Dieter Henrich
 Arnold Selig Hiatt
 Paul Felix Hoffman
 Bengt Robert Holmstrom
 Donald Leonard Horowitz
 Morton J. Horwitz
 Roger Evans Howe
 Kazuo Ishiguro
 Vaughan Frederick Randal Jones
 Daniel Kahneman
 Yuet Wai Kan
 Benita S. Katzenellenbogen
 Thomas Michael Keneally
 Donald R. Kinder
 Judith Pollock Klinman
 Ludwig Koenen
 Nicolai Vladimirovich Krylov
 Butler W. Lampson
 Lynn Therese Landmesser
 Richard O. Lempert
 Jane Lubchenco
 William H. Luers
 Yo-Yo Ma
 Anthony Peter Mahowald
 Thomas Edward Mann
 Tobin Jay Marks
 Barbara Joyce McNeil
 John Angus McPhee
 Mary Patterson McPherson
 David Mechanic
 William Hughes Miller
 Jose Rafael Moneo Valles
 Roger B. Myerson
 Tetsuo Najita
 Eldon Henry Newcomb
 Kyriacos Costa Nicolaou
 Mary Jo Nye
 Onora Sylvia O'Neill
 Marcel Ophuls
 Stuart Holland Orkin
 Yuri Fyodorovich Orlov
 Carl O. Pabo
 Stanley Ben Prusiner
 Albert Jordy Raboteau
 Julius Rebek, Jr.
 Frank Morris Richter
 Robert Eric Ricklefs
 Lynn Moorhead Riddiford
 Ronald Linn Rivest
 Lee David Ross
 Joan Elizabeth Roughgarden
 Donald Bruce Rubin
 Erkki Ruoslahti
 George Erik Rupp
 Robert Thomas Sauer
 Thomas Michael Scanlon, Jr.
 Frederick Franklin Schauer
 Ernst-Detlef Schulze
 Howard Schuman
 Edward M. Scolnick
 Denise Scott Brown
 Anthony Seeger
 Richard Serra
 Eric Manvers Shooter
 Daniel Solomon Simberloff
 John Brooks Slaughter
 H. Colin Slim
 Richard Alan Smith
 Barbara Boardman Smuts
 Gary Snyder
 Susan Solomon
 Jack C. Stillinger
 Nancy L. Stokey
 Gisela Striker
 John Brian Taylor
 Twyla Tharp
 Marta Tienda
 Jean Marcel Tirole
 George Henry Trilling
 Garretson Beekman Trudeau
 Olke Cornelis Uhlenbeck
 Jonathan William Uhr
 Herman Van Der Wee
 Peter M. Vitousek
 David Weiss Halivni
 Eric F. Wieschaus
 Frank Wilczek
 Garry Wills
 Richard W. Wrangham
 Gavin Wright
 Kurt Wuthrich

References 

1953